TCM Underground was a weekly late-night cult film showcase airing on Turner Classic Movies. Developed by former TCM marketing director Eric Weber, it was originally hosted by industrial rock/heavy metal musician and independent filmmaker Rob Zombie. The movies were programmed by Eric Weber until 2007, when TCM programmer Millie De Chirico took over the role. The block ended on February 24, 2023, following layoffs in December that included De Chirico.

The series was launched in an attempt to attract more young viewers to Turner's older-skewing audience. TCM began airing a new program titled Friday Night Spotlight and, in effect, TCM Underground was moved from its Friday time slot to Saturdays beginning April 6, 2013 (a TCM broadcast day runs from 6am – 5:59am EST the following day, making Underground, in fact, airing on Sunday); however, on March 10, 2018, the series returned to its original Friday night time slot. Promotional bumper material and opening credit sequences were created by Raygun. The series was periodically pre-empted by special month-long or seasonal scheduling themes, such as February's "31 Days of Oscar" film series and the month-long "Summer Under the Stars".  When it did not conflict with a special theme, TCM Underground aired in its usual slot early on Saturday morning.

The cult films featured in TCM Underground belonged to a number of genres, including but not limited to blaxploitation films (Coffy, Darktown Strutters, The Mack), horror, slasher, and giallo films (Let's Scare Jessica to Death, Black Christmas, Hatchet for the Honeymoon), and counterculture films (An American Hippie in Israel, Ciao! Manhattan, Blue Sunshine). Plan 9 from Outer Space was the block's first film broadcast when launched on October 13, 2006, paired with Bride of the Monster, and was also the block's final film when it closed on February 24, 2023, paired with various drug education short films.

List of feature films in the TCM Underground block

 13 Frightened Girls
 13 Ghosts
 The 5,000 Fingers of Dr. T.
 Abar, the First Black Superman
 ABBA: The Movie
 Absolute Beginners
 Across 110th Street
 After Hours
 Alex in Wonderland
 Alice, Sweet Alice
 Alien from L.A.
 All About Alice
 All Night Long
 ...All the Marbles
 Alligator
 Alligator 2: The Mutation
 Alone in the Dark
 Alphabet City
 An American Hippie in Israel
 American Ninja
 American Pop
 Anatomy of a Psycho
 Another Son of Sam
 The Apple
 Assault on Precinct 13
 Attack of the Crab Monsters
 The Awful Dr. Orloff
 Babo 73
 The Baby
 Baby Doll
 The Bad Seed
 Barbarella
 Bayou
 The Beast Must Die
 The Beast with Five Fingers
 Beat Street
 Belladonna of Sadness 5 March 2017
 Below the Belt
 Ben
 Berserk!
 The Beyond (film)
 Beyond the Valley of the Dolls
 Big Bad Mama
 The Big Cube
 The Big Doll House
 Billy the Kid vs. Dracula
 Black Belt Jones
 Black Caesar
 Black Christmas
 Black Eye
 Black Gunn
 Black Mama White Mama
 Black Moon
 Black Samson
 The Black Sleep
 Blacula
 Blast of Silence
 Blood and Black Lace
 Blood Feast
 Blood Freak
 The Blood on Satan's Claw
 Bloodmatch
 Bloody Birthday
 Blue Sunshine 7 December 2013
 Blue Steel
 Blue Velvet
 Bobbie Jo and the Outlaw
 Bone
 The Boogens
 Border Radio
 Born in Flames
 The Born Losers
 Boss Nigger
 Brainstorm
 Breakin'
 Breakin' 2: Electric Boogaloo
 Brewster McCloud
 Bride of the Monster
 Bring Me the Head of Alfredo Garcia
 The Brood
 Brothers
 A Bucket of Blood
 Burn, Witch, Burn
 Burnt Offerings
 Bus Riley's Back in Town
 C.C. and Company
 Caged
 Caged Heat
 The Caller
 The Candy Snatchers
 Carnival Magic
 The Cat o' Nine Tails
 Cat's Eye
 Chafed Elbows
 Chained for Life
 Cherry 2000
 Child Bride
 Children of the Damned
 The Chocolate War
 Chopping Mall
 Christmas Evil
 The Church
 Ciao! Manhattan
 The City of the Dead
 Class
 Class of 1984
 Clay Pigeon
 Cleopatra Jones
 Cleopatra Jones and the Casino of Gold
 Coffy
 College Confidential
 Coma
 The Conqueror Worm
 Cookie
 Cops and Robbers
 Corruption
 Corvette Summer
 Count Yorga, Vampire
 Countryman
 Cover Me Babe
 Crawlspace
 Crazed Fruit
 The Crazies
 The Crazy World of Julius Vrooder
 Crumb
 Curse of the Demon
 Cyborg
 Darktown Strutters
 Daughter of Horror
 Daughters of Satan
 Day of the Dead
 Dead Sleep
 The Dead Zone
 Deadly Friend
 Death By Invitation 21 December 2013
 Death Force
 Death Line
 Death Race 2000
 Death Watch
 Deathdream
 Deathsport
 The Decline of Western Civilization Part II: The Metal Years
 The Decline of Western Civilization III
 Deep End
 Dementia 13
 Derek
 The Devil Rides Out
 The Devil Within Her
 The Devil-Doll
 Die! Die! My Darling!
 Dirty Mary, Crazy Larry
 Disco Godfather
 Doctor Blood's Coffin
 Dolemite
 The Doll Squad
 Dolls
 Don't Open the Door!
 Door-to-Door Maniac
 Dr. Jekyll and Sister Hyde
 Dracula's Dog
 Dreamscape
 Drive, He Said
 Dudes
 Dusty and Sweets McGee
 Earth Girls Are Easy
 Eating Raoul
 Electra Glide in Blue
 Emma Mae
 Enter the Dragon
 Enter the Ninja
 Equinox
 Escape from New York
 Escort Girl
 Evil Dead II
 The Exiles
 Exorcist II: The Heretic
 Experiment in Terror
 Eye of the Devil
 Eyes of a Stranger
 Eyes of Laura Mars
 Fame
 Fantastic Planet 5 March 2017
 The Fast and the Furious
 Fast-Walking
 Faster, Pussycat! Kill! Kill!
 The Fastest Guitar Alive
 The Fearless Vampire Killers
 The Fearmakers
 Final Exam
 Five on the Black Hand Side
 Flesh Merchant
 Fleshpot on 42nd Street
 The Fog
 Forced Vengeance
 The Foreigner
 The Fox
 Foxes
 Foxy Brown
 Frankenstein 1970
 Frankenstein Created Woman
 Freaked
 Freaks
 Free Radicals: A History of Experimental Film
 Friday Foster
 Fright
 From Beyond
 From the Life of the Marionettes
 The Full Treatment
 Funeral Parade of Roses
 Galaxy of Terror
 Games
 The Gamma People
 Ganja and Hess
 The Garbage Pail Kids Movie
 Gator
 Ghoulies
 The Giant Spider Invasion
 Girls on the Loose
 The Glory Stompers
 God Told Me To
 Grand Theft Auto
 Greaser's Palace
 The Green Slime
 Grizzly
 Guru, the Mad Monk
 Gymkata
 Hackers
 The Hand
 Hard Ticket to Hawaii
 Hardcore
 The Harder They Come
 Hatchet for the Honeymoon
 The Haunting
 House aka Hausu, in September 2015
 Häxan
 He Knows You're Alone
 Head
 Heathers
 Heavenly Bodies
 Heavy Metal
 Hell Night
 Hell Up in Harlem
 Hell's Angels '69
 Hercules
 Here We Go Round the Mulberry Bush
 The Hidden
 Hiding Out
 High-Ballin'
 Hit Man
 The Hitman
 Homicidal
 The Honeymoon Killers
 Hooper
 Horror Express
 Hot Rods to Hell
 The House by the Cemetery
 The House of Seven Corpses 
 House of Usher
 House of Women
 The Howling
 The Hunger
 The Hypnotic Eye
 I Bury the Living
 I Love You, Alice B. Toklas
 I Saw What You Did
 I Was a Teenage Zombie
 Ice Castles
 The Ice Pirates
 I'm Gonna Git You Sucka
 In Cold Blood
 The Incredibly Strange Creatures Who Stopped Living and Became Mixed Up Zombies
 Incubus
 The Iron Rose
 Island of Lost Souls
 It Lives Again
 It's Alive
 J.C.
 Jennifer on My Mind
 Jesse James Meets Frankenstein's Daughter
 Jigoku
 Jubilee
 The Kids Are Alright
 Killer Klowns from Outer Space
 Kitten with a Whip
 Killer Party
 Kiss of the Tarantula
 Krull
 Ladies and Gentlemen, The Fabulous Stains
 Lady Snowblood
 Lady Snowblood: Love Song of Vengeance
 Lady Street Fighter
 Land of Doom
 The Last Dragon
 The Last Man on Earth
 The Lawnmower Man
 The Legend of Billie Jean
 The Legend of Hell House
 The Legend of Lylah Clare
 Lemora
 Let's Kill Uncle
 Let's Scare Jessica to Death
 Lifeforce
 Little Darlings
 The Little Girl Who Lives Down the Lane
 Logan's Run
 Lolita
 Look in Any Window
 Love Affair, or the Case of the Missing Switchboard Operator
 The Loveless
 Lunatics: A Love Story
 Lust in the Dust
 Mac and Me
 Macabre
 Machine Gun McCain
 The Mack
 Macon County Line
 Made in U.S.A. 
 Madhouse
 Magic
 Making Mr. Right
 Man Is Not a Bird
 Maniac
 The Manitou
 Marihuana (film)
 Mark of the Vampire
 Mary Jane's Not a Virgin Anymore
 Massacre Mafia Style 
 Maximum Overdrive
 Melinda
 Miami Connection
 Mixed Blood
 Model Shop
 Modern Girls
 Monster a Go-Go
 Motel Hell
 Mudhoney
 The Mummy
 The Mummy's Shroud
 The Mutations
 The Muthers
 Myra Breckinridge
 Mystery Train
 Near Dark
 The New Gladiators
 New Year's Evil
 New York Ninja
 Night of the Creeps
 Night of the Lepus
 Night of the Living Dead
 The Night of the Strangler
 Night School
 Night Train to Terror
 The Night Visitor
 Night Warning
 Night Watch
 Nightmare Honeymoon
 A Nightmare on Elm Street 2: Freddy's Revenge
 Ninja III: The Domination
 The Ninth Configuration
 Nothing Lasts Forever
 Of Unknown Origin
 The Oracle (1985 film)
 Orca
 Out of Bounds
 Outlaw Blues
 Over the Edge
 The Pace That Kills
 The Pack
 The Panic in Needle Park
 Pat Garrett and Billy the Kid
 Penitentiary
 Performance
 Phantom of the Rue Morgue
 Phase IV
 Pipe Dreams
 Piranha
 Plan 9 from Outer Space
 Poltergeist
 Polyester
 Poor Pretty Eddie
 Portrait of Jason
 Possession
 Prehistoric Women
 Pretty Poison
 The Private Files of J. Edgar Hoover
 Private Parts
 Private Property
 Psycho
 Psych-Out
 Psychomania
 The Psychopath
 Punk Vacation
 Puppet Master
 Putney Swope
 The Pyramid (1976 film)
 The Queen
 Queen of Blood
 Queen of Outer Space
 Rabid
 Race with the Devil
 Rad
 Rafferty and the Gold Dust Twins
 Rappin'
 Rat Pfink a Boo Boo
 Rattlers
 Razorback
 The Rebel Rousers
 Red Sonja
 Reefer Madness
 Remember My Name
 Repo Man
 Repulsion
 Return of the Street Fighter
 Return to Macon County
 Revenge of the Ninja
 Rich Kids
 Riki-Oh: The Story of Ricky
 River's Edge
 Roadgames
 The Road to Ruin
 RoboCop
 RoboCop 2
 The Robot vs. The Aztec Mummy
 Rock 'n' Roll High School
 Roller Boogie
 S.F.W.
 The Sadist
 Salt of the Earth
 Santa Claus
 Santa Claus Conquers the Martians
 Satanis
 Scanners
 Scary Movie (1991 film)
 Scenes from the Class Struggle in Beverly Hills
 Schizoid
 Scissors
 Scream Blacula Scream
 Scream, Queen! My Nightmare on Elm Street
 Screaming Mimi
 Secret Ceremony
 Sex Madness
 Shack Out on 101
 Shaft in Africa
 Shanks
 She Freak
 Shock
 Shock Corridor
 Shoot First, Die Later
 The Shooting
 The Shout
 Sid and Nancy
 The Sid Saga
 Silent Night, Deadly Night
 The Silent Partner
 Sister Street Fighter
 Sisters
 Skidoo
 The Slams
 The Slumber Party Massacre
 Smithereens
 Snapshot
 Solomon King
 Something Weird
 Some Call It Loving
 Sometimes Aunt Martha Does Dreadful Things
 Sonny Boy
 The Sorcerers
 Spider Baby 
 Spine Tingler! The William Castle Story
 The Stepfather
 Strait-Jacket
 Strange Behavior
 The Strangler
 The Street Fighter
 Stunt Rock
 Stunts
 Suburbia
 Sugar Hill
 The Super Cops
 Super Fly
 Superstition
 Suspiria
 Swamp Thing
 The Swarm
 Sweet Jesus, Preacherman
 The Swinger
 The Sword of Doom
 Symbiopsychotaxiplasm
 The Take
 Taking Tiger Mountain
 Tarzan, the Ape Man
 The Tempest
 Tentacles
 Ten Violent Women
 Terminal Island
 The Terminal Man
 The Terror
 The Terror of Tiny Town
 TerrorVision
 The Texas Chainsaw Massacre 2
 Thank God It's Friday
 Them!
 They Came from Beyond Space
 They Live
 The Thing That Couldn't Die
 Thrashin'
 Three the Hard Way
 Times Square
 The Tingler
 Tintorera
 Tokaido Yotsuya kaidan
 Tower of Evil
 The Town That Dreaded Sundown
 Trick Baby
 The Trip
 Trog
 Truck Turner
 Twice Upon a Time
 The Twilight People
 Twin Peaks: Fire Walk with Me
 Two Thousand Maniacs!
 Two-Lane Blacktop
 The Twonky
 UHF
 The Undertaker and His Pals
 Unholy Rollers
 The Unholy Three
 The Unknown
 Valley of the Dolls
 The Vampire Bat
 Vanishing Point
 The Velvet Vampire
 Venus in Furs
 Vibes
 Vigilante
 The Visitor
 Viva Knievel!
 The Wages of Fear
 Watermelon Man
 Welcome to the Dollhouse
 West of Zanzibar
 What Ever Happened to Baby Jane?
 What's the Matter with Helen?
 When a Stranger Calls
 White Lightning
 White Line Fever
 Who's That Girl
 Whoever Slew Auntie Roo?
 Wicked Stepmother
 Wicked, Wicked
 The Wicker Man
 Wigstock: The Movie
 Wild at Heart
 Wild Guitar
 Wild in the Streets
 Wild Seed
 Wild, Wild Planet
 Willard
 Willie Dynamite
 Witchboard
 The Witches
 Witchfinder General
 Without You I'm Nothing
 Women's Prison
 The World's Greatest Sinner
 Xanadu
 The Yakuza
 Zaat
 Zabriskie Point
 Zardoz
 Zig Zag
 The Zodiac Killer
 Zombies of Mora Tau
 Zotz!

List of short films (under 45 minutes) in the TCM Underground block
Age 13
The Alphabet (film)
Always on Sunday
The Amputee
Ask Me, Don't Tell Me
The Assignation
The Bottle and the Throttle
Boys Beware
Bridge from No Place
Changing
The Corvair in Action!
Dating Do's and Don'ts
A Day in the Death of Donny B
Delicious Dishes
Destination Earth
The Dropout
Duck and Cover (film)
DumbLand
Flowers of Darkness
Fragment of Seeking
Gang Boy
The Golden Years (1960 film)
Good Eating Habits
The Grandmother (1970 film)
Holiday from Rules?
The House in the Middle
I Was a Teenage Serial Killer
Keep Off the Grass
LSD-25
LSD: Insight or Insanity?
Living Stereo
Match Your Mood
Movie Trailer
A Movable Feast (film)
A Movable Scene
Multiple SIDosis
Narcotics: Pit of Despair
On the Edge
One Got Fat
Picnic (1948 film)
Perversion for Profit
Premonition Following an Evil Deed
The Relaxed Wife
R.F.D. Greenwich Village
Right or Wrong (Making Moral Decisions)
The Roman Springs on Mrs. StoneShake Hands with DangerSignal 30Six Men Getting Sick (Six Times)Spy on the FlySummer of '63Tear Gas in Law EnforcementThe Terrible TruthTime Out for TroubleThe Trip BackThe Trouble MakerUsherA Visit to SantaWhat Really Happened to Baby JaneWhen You Grow UpWild at the WheelThe Wonderful World of TupperwareThe Wormwood StarThe Your Name Here StorySee also
 Midnight movie
 B movieMonsterVision'' (a similar programming block formerly aired on sister network TNT)

References

External links
 
 

2000s American television series
Turner Classic Movies original programming
Midnight movie television series
American motion picture television series
Television programming blocks
English-language television shows